Plagiolepis is an ant genus of the formic acid-producing subfamily Formicinae. The genus is found in tropical and temperate regions of the Old World.

Species

Plagiolepis abyssinica Forel, 1894
Plagiolepis adynata Bolton, 1995
Plagiolepis alluaudi Emery, 1894
Plagiolepis ampeloni (Faber, 1969)
Plagiolepis ancyrensis Santschi, 1920
Plagiolepis arnoldii Dlussky, Soyunov & Zabelin, 1990
Plagiolepis augusti Emery, 1921
Plagiolepis balestrierii Menozzi, 1939
†Plagiolepis balticus Dlussky, 1997
Plagiolepis bicolor Forel, 1901
Plagiolepis boltoni Sharaf, Aldawood & Taylor, 2011
Plagiolepis breviscapa Collingwood & Van Harten, 2005
Plagiolepis brunni Mayr, 1895
Plagiolepis calva Radchenko, 1996
Plagiolepis capensis Mayr, 1865
Plagiolepis cardiocarenis Chang & He, 2002
Plagiolepis chirindensis Arnold, 1949
Plagiolepis clarki Wheeler, 1934
Plagiolepis compressa Radchenko, 1996
Plagiolepis decora Santschi, 1914
Plagiolepis demangei Santschi, 1920
Plagiolepis deweti Forel, 1904
Plagiolepis dichroa Forel, 1902
Plagiolepis dlusskyi Radchenko, 1996
Plagiolepis exigua Forel, 1894
Plagiolepis flavescens Collingwood, 1976
Plagiolepis funicularis Santschi, 1919
Plagiolepis fuscula Emery, 1895
Plagiolepis grassei Le Masne, 1956
Plagiolepis hoggarensis Bernard, 1981
Plagiolepis intermedia Emery, 1895
Plagiolepis jerdonii Forel, 1894
Plagiolepis jouberti Forel, 1910
Plagiolepis juddi Sharaf, Aldawood & Taylor, 2011
Plagiolepis karawajewi Radchenko, 1989
†Plagiolepis klinsmanni Mayr, 1868
†Plagiolepis kuenowi Mayr, 1868
†Plagiolepis labilis Emery, 1891
Plagiolepis livingstonei Santschi, 1926
Plagiolepis longwang Terayama, 2009
Plagiolepis lucidula Wheeler, 1934
Plagiolepis madecassa Forel, 1892
Plagiolepis mediorufa Forel, 1916
†Plagiolepis minutissima Dlussky & Perkovsky, 2002
Plagiolepis moelleri Bingham, 1903
Plagiolepis montivaga Arnold, 1958
Plagiolepis nitida Karavaiev, 1935
Plagiolepis nynganensis McAreavey, 1949
Plagiolepis pallescens Forel, 1889
†Plagiolepis paradoxa Dlussky, 2010
Plagiolepis pictipes Santschi, 1914
Plagiolepis pissina Roger, 1863
Plagiolepis pontii Menozzi, 1939
Plagiolepis puncta Forel, 1910
Plagiolepis pygmaea (Latreille, 1798)
Plagiolepis regis Karavaiev, 1931
Plagiolepis rogeri Forel, 1894
Plagiolepis schmitzii Forel, 1895
Plagiolepis simoni Emery, 1921
†Plagiolepis singularis Mayr, 1868
†Plagiolepis solitaria Mayr, 1868
†Plagiolepis squamifera Mayr, 1868
Plagiolepis squamulosa Wheeler, 1934
†Plagiolepis succini André, 1895
Plagiolepis sudanica Weber, 1943
Plagiolepis taurica Santschi, 1920
Plagiolepis vanderkelleni Forel, 1901
Plagiolepis vindobonensis Lomnicki, 1925
Plagiolepis vladileni Radchenko, 1996
†Plagiolepis wheeleri Dlussky, 2010
Plagiolepis wilsoni (Clark, 1934)
Plagiolepis xene Stärcke, 1936

References

External links

Formicinae
Ant genera
Taxa named by Gustav Mayr
Taxonomy articles created by Polbot